Acacia cochlocarpa is a shrub belonging to the genus Acacia and the subgenus Juliflorae. It is native to Western Australia.

The branchlets are slightly flexuose with persistent stipules. It has erect, narrowly oblong-elliptic shaped and incurved phyllodes. There are two simple inflorescences per axil.

It has a scattered distribution in the Wheatbelt of Western Australia where it grows in sandy, clay gravelly soils often around laterite. Found in areas around Watheroo and Manmanning as a part of sandy heathland communities.

There are two known subspecies:
Acacia cochlocarpa Meisn. subsp. cochlocarpa
Acacia cochlocarpa subsp. velutinosa Maslin & A.R.Chapman 

A cochlocarpa is similar in appearance and closely related to Acacia lirellata and is also closely related to Acacia tetraneura.

See also
 List of Acacia species

References

cochlocarpa
Acacias of Western Australia
Plants described in 1855
Taxa named by Carl Meissner